Lophophelma loncheres is a moth of the family Geometridae first described by Louis Beethoven Prout in 1931. It is found on Peninsular Malaysia, Sumatra and Borneo. The habitat consists of lowland forests.

References

Pseudoterpnini
Moths described in 1931
Taxa named by Louis Beethoven Prout